Boyka: Undisputed (also known as Boyka: Undisputed 4), is a 2017 American-Bulgarian martial arts film directed by Todor Chapkanov, and written by David White and Tony Mosher from a story by Boaz Davidson. It is the sequel to the 2010 film Undisputed III: Redemption. Scott Adkins reprises his role as Yuri Boyka.

Plot
The film takes place several months after the events of the previous film. Martial artist Yuri Boyka is now a free man and has a manager named Kiril. He still fights in underground matches in Kyiv, Ukraine. In a match, Boyka accidentally kills his opponent Viktor. He begins to regret this and thinks about what he is fighting for. After discovering Viktor has a wife named Alma, Boyka tells Kiril to make a fake passport and goes to Russia to meet Alma.

In the Russian town of Drovny, Boyka finds out that Alma owes money to a crime boss named Zourab. Alma lives in a community center and she serves as a waitress in Zourab's underground fighting club. Zourab is now searching for a good martial artist to fight in his club. Boyka wants to help Alma pay her debt so he makes a deal with Zourab that he will fight for him in exchange for Alma's freedom. Zourab agrees and suggests Boyka to fight in three matches.

Alma invites Boyka to the training room in the community center for his training. Boyka easily defeats his opponent in the first match. He then must fight two brothers in the second match and defeats them by double knock out. In the community center, Boyka asks Alma why she does not leave the town. She replies she cannot leave the children, and without this center the children could become gangsters or bad guys.

In the third match, Boyka defeats Igor Kazmir, the elite henchman of Zourab. He is about to leave, but Zourab forces him to fight one more match to defeat his true champion; Boyka reluctantly agrees. Zourab bribes a high-ranking police officer to bring Koshmar to his club. Koshmar is a giant, furious and relentless martial artist. Zourab thinks Boyka cannot defeat Koshmar.

Because Koshmar has a large and strong body, at first Boyka cannot hurt him. After some intense moments, Boyka breaks one arm and one leg of Koshmar and finally kicks him out of the ring, knocking him unconscious. An angered Zourab takes Alma as a hostage and orders his henchmen to kill Boyka. However, Boyka kills all of Zourab's henchmen and chases after him. Boyka gets shot in his stomach, but he grabs Zourab, punches him in his face and chokes him to death. An injured Boyka asks Alma if she can forgive him for what he did to her husband and is arrested by the police shortly after.

Six months later, Alma visits Boyka in prison. She tells him she finally forgives him and he thanks her. Boyka continues fighting in the prison to pursue the title of most complete martial artist in the world.

Cast
 Scott Adkins as Yuri Boyka
 Teodora Duhovnikova as Alma
 Alon Moni Aboutboul as Zourab
 Julian Vergov as Slava
 Brahim Achabbakhe as Igor Kazmir
 Paul Chahidi as Kiril
 Petio Petkov as Dominik
 Valentin Ganev as Warden Markov
 Vladimir Mihaylov as the Priest
 Martyn Ford as Koshmar
 Vladimir Kolev as Koychev
 Emilien De Falco as Viktor
 Tim Man as Ozerov Brother #1
 Andreas Nguyen as Ozerov Brother #2

Production
The film was previously known under the working title Undisputed IV. Isaac Florentine, who had helmed the second and third installments, was slated to direct this one as well. He ultimately opted to pass on the directing gig to tend to his ill wife, although he remained involved as a producer. The job went to Todor Chapkanov, who had performed second unit duties on Nu Image's major production London Has Fallen just prior.

After J.J. Perry in Undisputed 2 and Larnell Stovall in Undisputed III, the series enlisted a new fight choreographer again, although Tim Mann had already collaborated with Adkins on Nu Image's Ninja: Shadow of a Tear.
Israeli actor Alon Moni Aboutboul, who was the primary antagonist in London Has Fallen, plays mob boss and main villain Zourab.

Boyka: Undisputed marked the feature debut of British bodybuilder Martyn Ford, who is billed at 6 ft 8 in and 325 lb. His character's name, Koshmar, is Russian for "Nightmare", which became his real-life nickname in the wake of the film's release.

Principal photography took place in Bulgaria at Nu Boyana Film Studios. It was scheduled to commence on June 29, 2015, and concluded on July 31.

On November 10, 2015, it was announced that the film had completed post-production. It is dedicated to veteran Nu Image producer Danny Lerner, who passed away during pre-production.

Release

Theatrical
On September 22, 2016, the film premiered at the Fantastic Fest in Austin, Texas. The film was also released theatrically in some Middle Eastern markets on July 27, 2017.

Home media
Universal Pictures Home Entertainment released the film in the U.S. on Blu-ray and DVD on August 1, 2017, under the title Boyka: Undisputed 4.

Reception

Accolades
Boyka: Undisputed won the Best Fight Award, while Scott Adkins won the Jackie Chan Best Action Movie Actor Award for his portrayal of Yuri Boyka at the 2017 Shanghai Film Festival.

Future
A TV-series that will continue the story of the Undisputed movie franchise has been announced with original producer Millennium and London-based sales banner Empire Films.

References

External links
 
 

2016 films
2016 martial arts films
2016 action films
2016 independent films
2010s prison films
American action films
American martial arts films
American independent films
American prison films
Direct-to-video sequel films
2010s English-language films
Films about the Russian Mafia
Films set in the 2010s
Films set in Kyiv
Films set in Ukraine
Films set in Russia
Films shot at Nu Boyana Film Studios
Martial arts tournament films
Mixed martial arts films
Underground fighting films
Undisputed (film series)
Films produced by Boaz Davidson
Films with screenplays by Boaz Davidson
2010s American films